Davis is a surname of English and Welsh origin. 
As an English surname it may be a corruption of Davy or a reference to King David in the Old Testament. As a Welsh surname may be a corruption of Dyfed, related to Irish colonists who occupied an area of southwest Wales in the late third century and established a dynasty there which lasted five centuries. Dyfed is recorded as a surname as late as the twelfth century, e.g. Gwynfard Dyfed, born 1175. Dafydd (generally translated into English as David) appears as a given name in the thirteenth century, e.g. Dafydd ap Gruffydd (1238–1283), Prince of Wales, and Dafydd ab Edmwnd, a Welsh poet. Alternatively, Davis may be a patronymic surname (son of David).

Davis is the 45th most common surname in England and 68th most common in Wales. According to the 2000 United States census, it is the seventh most frequently reported surname, accounting for 0.48% of the population, preceding Garcia and following Miller. It was the seventh most common surname in the United States in 2014. It is also recorded in the spellings of Davies, Davison and several others.

References

External links
Davis Family Papers, 1829–1915 New-York Historical Society

English-language surnames
Surnames of Welsh origin
Anglicised Welsh-language surnames
Patronymic surnames
Jewish surnames
Surnames from given names